Kiss Me Quick or kiss-me-quick may refer to:

 Kiss Me Quick!, a 1964 film directed by Peter Perry
 "Kiss Me Quick" (Elvis Presley song), 1964
 "Kiss Me Quick" (Nathan Sykes song), 2015
 Kiss-me-quick hat
 "Kiss Me Quick", a song by Sam Beam and Jesca Hoop from the 2016 album Love Letter for Fire

Kiss-me-quick is a common name of several plants, including:

 Brunfelsia grandiflora
 Centranthus ruber
 Portulaca pilosa